A parade is a procession of people.

Parade or The Parade may also refer to:

Arts, entertainment, and media

Films
 Parade (1974 film), film by Jacques Tati
 Parade (2009 film), Japanese film starring Tatsuya Fujiwara
 Parades, a 1972 film starring David Doyle
 The Parade (film), a 2011 Serbian film

Music

Groups and labels
 Parade (band), a British girl group
 The Parade (band), an American soft rock group from LA. Hit "Sunshine Girl"(1967)
 Parade, Italian record label founded by Ennio Morricone

Albums
 Parade (Ron Carter album), 1979
 Parade (Minori Chihara album), 2008
 Parade (GO!GO!7188 album), 2006
 Parade (Plastic Tree album), 2000
 Parade (Prince album), 1986
 Parade Tour (Prince), a 1986 tour in support of the Prince album
 Parade (Parade album), 2011
 Parade (Spandau Ballet album), 1984
 Parade (Deen album), 2017
 Parade -Respective Tracks of Buck-Tick-, a 2005 Buck-Tick tribute album
 Parades (Efterklang album), 2007
 Parade, a 2006 album by Barbie Almalbis

Songs
 Parade (Dev song), 2015
 "Parade," a song by Magazine from their 1978 album Real Life
 "Parade", a 1977 song by Roger Daltrey from One of the Boys
 "Parade," a song by J-pop band Chaba
 "Parade", a song by Matchbox Twenty from the album North
 "Parade," a song by Tyler the Creator from the album Bastard
 "Parade", a song by Bedhead from the album Transaction de Novo

Musicals 
 Parade (musical), a 1998 musical with a score by Jason Robert Brown and book by Alfred Uhry
 Parade, a 1935 musical revue by Jerome Moross
 Parade (revue), an Off-Broadway revue by Jerry Herman

Periodicals
 Parade (British magazine), a British magazine for men
Parade (magazine), an American nationwide Sunday newspaper magazine

Television 
"Parade" (Bottom), an episode of the British television sitcom Bottom
Parade (TV series), Canadian music variety television series which aired from 1959 to 1964
 Parade Parade, a 1996 Japanese original video animation series

Other uses in arts, entertainment, and media
 Parade (ballet), a 1916–17 ballet with music by Erik Satie and a one-act scenario by Jean Cocteau
Parade (French street entertainment), a type of entertainment which originated during the Renaissance
Parade Theatre, Sydney, Australia

Places
 Parade, South Dakota, a community in the United States
 Parade Square (Plac Defilad w Warszawie), a square in downtown Warsaw
 The Parade, Adelaide
 Parade, Leamington Spa, Warwickshire, England

Other uses
 Military parade
 Parade College, an Australian Roman Catholic all-boys high school
 Parade House, Monmouth, a building in Monmouth, Wales
 Parade Park Maintenance Building, a building in Kansas City, Missouri from 1912

See also 
 Hit Parade (disambiguation)
 The Big Parade (disambiguation)